Shady Grove is an unincorporated community in Taylor County, Florida, United States. Shady Grove has a post office with ZIP code 32357.

References

Unincorporated communities in Taylor County, Florida